Drumragh Sarsfields is a Gaelic Athletic Association club based in the village of Clanabogan between Omagh and Dromore in County Tyrone, Northern Ireland. The club was founded in 1972 as a result of an amalgamation of Tattysallagh St. Eugenes and Tattyreagh St.Patricks. Drumragh Sarsfields GAC is a quickly growing Club which has recently completed development of Clubrooms along with two pitches. Phase III of development is currently in progress.

History
Drumragh Sarsfields GAC was formed in 1972 after the amalgamation of Tattysallagh St Eugenes and Tattyreagh St Patricks at a time when neither club was particularly pleased with its performance. St Eugenes, founded in the late 1890s was one of the oldest clubs locally, and won the County Junior Championship in 1942.

Hounors
 Tyrone Junior Football Championship (2)
 1987, 1999

Recent Years
In recent years the club has rapidly moved forward with new club rooms and two new pitches, one of which is floodlit. The Club's membership has grown rapidly in the last few years. Drumragh have one of the highest memberships in the county along with one of the highest Youth memberships which is helped by a dynamic Youth program. The community and members are at the heart of the Club while Drumragh has also become a front runner in the use of social media and technology to development the experience of its members.

Drumragh fields over 18 teams at all age categories with both male and female teams. The Club enjoys the support of a strong local community and has recently begun offering facilities for local clubs.

Notable players
Former Tyrone Minor and current club player Gareth Haughey became the first Omagh CBS captain to lift the Hogan Cup in April 2007. Tyrone Ladies players Sinead McLaughlin and Neamh Woods have both won All-Stars and currently play for Drumragh and have an active role in the running of ladies teams within the Club. Club Minor and Under 21 player Aaron Montgomery was a member of the Tyrone GAA U17 team which won the Ulster League & Championship and inaugural All Ireland Championship in 2017.

Gaelic games clubs in County Tyrone
Gaelic football clubs in County Tyrone